Steven Maeda is an American television producer and screenwriter. He has written episodes of television series such as Harsh Realm, The X-Files, CSI: Miami, Lost, and Day Break. He has also served as a supervising producer on Lost and CSI: Miami. He was the executive producer of Lie To Me.

Career
Maeda joined the crew of Lost as a supervising producer and writer for the series second season in 2005. Maeda and the Lost writing staff won the Writers Guild of America (WGA) Award for Best Dramatic Series at the February 2006 ceremony for their work on the first and second seasons. The writing staff were nominated for the award again at the February 2007 ceremony for their work on the second and third seasons. Maeda did not return for the series' third season.

In 2011, Maeda was hired as showrunner of Pan Am, in the middle of its first season. He also served as executive producer and showrunner for Syfy's Helix. In January 2020, He was announced as the showrunner of One Piece, an upcoming Netflix original series based on the manga series by Eiichiro Oda.

Filmography

References

External links 

21st-century American screenwriters
American television writers
American male television writers
American male screenwriters
Living people
Year of birth missing (living people)
American people of Japanese descent
Writers Guild of America Award winners